Callomphala is a genus of sea snails, marine gastropod mollusks in the family Skeneidae.

Callomphala is considered by the Australian Faunal Directory as a synonym of Teinostoma (Callomphala) Adams & Angas, 1864, belonging to the family Tornidae The genus Teinostoma used to be placed within the family Skeneidae.

Species
Species within the genus Callomphala include:
 Callomphala globosa Hedley, 1901
 Callomphala hoeksemai Moolenbeek & Hoenselaar, 2008
 Callomphala lucida (A. Adams & Angas, 1864)
Species brought into synonymy
  Callomphala alta Laseron, 1954: synonym of Callomphala lucida (A. Adams & Angas, 1864)

References

External links
 Laseron, Revision of the Liotiidae of New South Wales; the Australian zoologist v. 12 1954-1959

 
Skeneidae